Rapid was the brig that brought William Light's surveying party to the new colony of South Australia. She was wrecked in 1841.

History
Rapid was built in 1826 at Yarmouth, and featured a carved figurehead in the shape of a greyhound. She first appeared in Lloyd's Register (LR) in 1826 with William Joy, master, Priest & Co., owner, and trade Yarmouth–Hull. The next year her owner became Brest and her trade became Hull–St Petersburg.

South Australia

The board of commissioners of the South Australian Company purchased her to send out on their first fleet to establish the Colony of South Australia and the city of Adelaide. The company added a deck for passenger exercise, but as the height between decks was 4'1" (1.25 m), it was hardly luxurious. On 1 May 1836, Rapid left Blackwall, and sailed down the English Channel under the command of Col. William Light; she reached Kangaroo Island on 17 August 1836.

Light's crew included Lieut. G. M. Field, R.N. (first officer), Lieut. (later Admiral) William S. Pullen (second officer), Lieut. R. Hill (third officer) and Thomas Woodforde (surgeon). Other members of the party were William Bell, W. Bradley, Robert Buck snr, Robert Buck jnr, William Chatfield, George Childs, William Claughton, John Duncan, William Freemantle, Maria Gandy, Light's common-law wife (referred to as his housekeeper), and her young brothers, Edward and William, Thomas Gepp, Robert Goddard, William Hodges, William Jacob, William Lawes, James Lewis, George Mildred, Hiram Mildred, George Penton, and Robert G. Thomas, John Thorn, John Thorpe, William Tuckey.

Rapid was used for survey work at Port Adelaide, and in 1837 sailed to England under Capt. William George Field with G. S. Kingston on board to report to the Colonisation Commissioners on the needs of the Survey Department. She returned to Adelaide in June 1838. She subsequently made several trips to Launceston, Van Diemen's Land. Lloyd's Register for 1841 (published in 1840), still carried her master as Light and her owner as the Australian Company.

Fate
In 1840 Rapid was sold to Capt. Arthur Devlin. She was wrecked on a coral island near Rotuma early in the morning of 14 January 1841 while on a voyage from Port Jackson (Sydney), to China. All on board were rescued by Capt. Joseph Underwood of the whaling barque Avon, but not before their cargo and valuables had been appropriated by the island's traditional owners.

Recognition
Mr. Roper, harbormaster at Second Valley, found an anchor at Rapid Bay that was believed to be the one Rapid lost.
The South Australian Maritime Museum holds an oil painting of Rapid by Doreen Bice (niece of J. G. Bice) after a watercolor sketch by Colonel Light.
A number of Adelaide citizens claim descent from passengers on Rapid. Those listed in 1936 were: Mr. Alfred Barker, Mrs. Dean Berry, Mrs. Mary L. Brown, Mr. Malcolm Collins. Misses M. K. and R. Cussen, Mrs. F. Martin. Miss Florence Mildred, Mrs. L. Wray, Mrs. Percival Stow, Mrs. Annie Ross, Mrs. Willis, Dr. Helen Mayo, Miss Mayo, Mr. Hubert Mayo. K.C., Dr. John Mayo. Miss O'Halloran, Miss E. K. Barker. Miss Emily Penton, Mrs. F. M. Pratt, Mrs. M. Stenhouse, Mrs. F. J. Sweetapple and Mrs. H. W. Wunderley.

References 

Brigs of Australia
1826 ships
Shipwrecks of Fiji
Maritime incidents in January 1841
Age of Sail merchant ships of England